Melica glabrescens is a species of grass found in Buenos Aires and Río Negro, Argentina.

Description
They also have ciliate margins and rough, scabrous surface.

Spikelets are obovate, solitary and have fertile spikelets that are pediceled. The pedicels are filiform, curved, pubescent, and hairy above.

The species' lemma have ciliated margins that are hairy in the middle. Flowers are ciliate, fleshy, and truncate. They also have caryopsis with additional pericarp and linear hilum.

Ecology
Its flowering time is from October to November.

References

glabrescens
Endemic flora of Argentina
Flora of South America